Hu Qili (born 6 October 1929) is a former high-ranking politician of the Chinese Communist Party (CCP). He was a member of the CCP Politburo Standing Committee and a member of its Secretariat between 1987 and 1989. In 1989, he was purged because of his sympathy toward the students of the 1989 Tiananmen Square protests and his support for General Secretary Zhao Ziyang. However, he was able to get back into politics in 1991. In 2001, he was named chairman of the Soong Ching-ling Foundation.

Early career
Hu was born on 6 October 1929 in Yulin, Shaanxi Province. In 1946, he was admitted to the Peking University to  pursue a major in physics. In 1948 and at the age of 19, Hu joined the CCP. When the People's Republic of China was founded in 1949, Hu changed his studies to focus on politics.

From 1951 to 1956, Hu was secretary of the Communist Youth League Committee of Peking University. From 1956 to 1966, he served as the president of the All-China Students’ Federation. In 1958, Hu was granted an audience with Chairman Mao Zedong.

During the Cultural Revolution, Hu began to work in the lower levels of the May Seventh Cadre Schools. From 1972 to 1977, he served as the deputy secretary of the Ningxia County Communist Party Committee, the deputy secretary of the Guyuan  district  Communist Party Committee, and the office director of the Ningxia Hui Autonomous Region Party Committee.

After the Cultural Revolution, he served as the deputy president of  Tsinghua University. From 1978 to 1980, Hu was a member of the Secretariat of the Communist Youth League Central Committee and was president of the All-China Youth Federation. From 1980 to 1982, he was the party secretary and the mayor of Tianjin. From 1982 to 1987, he was the director of the General Office, a member of the Secretariat, and a member of the  Political Bureau of the CCP Central Committee . From 1987 to 1989, Hu served as a member of the Standing Committee, the Political Bureau, and the Secretariat of the CCP Central Committee.

Tiananmen Square protests

On 15 April 1989, after the death of former General Secretary Hu Yaobang, Beijing university students began to assemble in Tiananmen Square to protest. This was the beginning of the Tiananmen Democracy Movement. General Secretary Zhao Ziyang thought that the government should talk with the student protestors. As a member of the Standing Committee of the Political Bureau of the CCP Central Committee and a member of the Secretariat of the CCP Central Committee, Hu was placed in charge of propaganda. Hu followed Zhao's instructions and began a  propaganda policy for openness and tolerance in engaging the students in dialogue.

On 29 April 1989, the People’s Daily published an editorial titled, Keep Stable, Keep Overall Situation. Hu  made comments that the Beijing students had begun to act reasonably and that the Chinese government needed to offer more accurate news for the students. He also believed that the student movement should be reported on accurately and without misinformation. Hu also  agreed with Zhao Ziyang's speech.  On 3 May 1989, Zhao made a speech to commemorate the May Fourth Movement for its 70th anniversary. In it, he stated that the Beijing students loved China and called of continued talks with the student leaders.

On 19 May 1989, there was an evening meeting to brief the Standing Committee. Zhao refused to accept the command of instituting martial law as proposed by Premier  Li Peng. Out of all the members of the Standing Committee, only two were opposed to martial law: Zhao and Hu. This began the change of Hu's political future.

The Fourth Plenum of the Thirteenth Central Committee  was held on the 23 and 24 of June 1989. They approved a decision made two days earlier at a meeting of the Politburo to strip Hu and Zhao as well as Rui Xingwen and Yan Mingfu of their party posts. For a period of time, Hu was finished in politics in China.

Return to government
In 1991, Hu returned to politics and was appointed as vice minister and Leading Party Members' Group member of the Ministry of the Machine-Building and Electronics Industry. From 1993 to 1998, he was the minister of the Ministry of the  Machine-Building and Electronics Industry.

In 1998, Hu was elected vice chairman of the Chinese People's Political Consultative Conference. He had a mandate to restore proper political treatment of leaders of the party and state. By convention, persons who hold positions of the Vice-Chairs of the NPC, vice chairman of the CPPCC  or above are referred to " Leaders of the Party and the State " (党和国家领导人) in the official media. 
He was appointed the chairman of the China Soong Ching Ling Foundation in 2001, which deals with Chinese charities and welfare projects. Hu retired from office in March 2003.

Significance
Hu Qili was known in the 1980s because of the country's economic reform program champion. After Deng Xiaoping  returned to government in 1978, Hu started to rise  rapidly. Hu was also once seen as a potential future candidate for General Secretary (party leader). After 1987, Hu was a member of the Standing Committee of the Political Bureau of the CCP Central Committee, was purged apparently because of sympathies he held for the students  carrying out the Tiananmen Square protests and opposed use of armed force to suppress those student and public peoples.

References

External links 
  Biography of Hu Qili, People's Daily Online.

1929 births
Living people
Mayors of Tianjin
Politicians from Yulin, Shaanxi
People's Republic of China politicians from Shaanxi
Chinese Communist Party politicians from Shaanxi
Members of the 13th Politburo Standing Committee of the Chinese Communist Party
Members of the Secretariat of the Chinese Communist Party
Members of the 12th Politburo of the Chinese Communist Party
Vice Chairpersons of the National Committee of the Chinese People's Political Consultative Conference
Directors of the General Office of the Chinese Communist Party